Mui Tsz Lam is a village in Sha Tin District, Hong Kong.

Administration
Mui Tsz Lam is a recognized village under the New Territories Small House Policy.

History
Mui Tsz Lam, together with neighboring Mau Ping, were historically part of the Luk Yeuk (league), centered on the township of Sai Kung.

References

Further reading

External links

 Delineation of area of existing village Mui Tsz Lam (Sha Tin) for election of resident representative (2019 to 2022)

Villages in Sha Tin District, Hong Kong